David Freese's 2011 World Series home run was a baseball play that occurred in Game 6 of the 2011 World Series on October 27, 2011, at Busch Stadium in St. Louis, Missouri. After the Texas Rangers had taken the lead in the ninth and tenth innings by two runs each, the St. Louis Cardinals rallied twice to keep the score tied. Jake Westbrook pitched a scoreless 11th inning to set up a walk-off home run by Freese off of Mark Lowe to tie the series and force Game 7, which the Cardinals won.

Background

Freese was projected to start the 2011 season, and he was named the starter on Opening Day, despite suffering minor ailments during spring training.  He started off the year batting over .320, but he missed 51 games after being hit by a pitch that fractured his left hand. After returning to the starting lineup, he finished the season with a .297 batting average, 10 home runs, and 55 RBIs. He recorded hits in eight of the final nine regular-season games. Freese credited his improvement in power hitting to hitting coach Mark McGwire, who helped him refine his stroke.

Postseason
The Cardinals returned to the playoffs in 2011 by usurping the Wild Card spot on the final day from the Atlanta Braves after falling  games behind on the 130th game.  Thus they completed the largest comeback in history with 32 left to play.  Due to their fixtures in different divisions, they played fewer head-to-head games, further lowering Cardinals' odds of catching the Braves.  

In the NLDS, the Cardinals defeated the Phillies. Freese drove in four runs against Philadelphia in Game 4 to force a fifth game. Game 5 featured a pitching duel between Chris Carpenter and Phillies ace Roy Halladay that became the first NL playoff series to end in a 1–0 score and Carpenter's second complete game shutout clincher of the season. In the National League Championship Series (NLCS) against Milwaukee, Freese had a .545 batting average, hit 3 home runs, drove in 9 runs, and scored 7 runs. He was named the NLCS Most Valuable Player. 

Because the National League had won the 2011 MLB All-Star Game, home field advantage went to the Cardinals as the National League champions, thus allowing the team to host the Texas Rangers for Games 1, 2, 6 and 7. Game 1 was won by the Cardinals on October 1. Through Game 3 of the World Series, Freese had a 13-game postseason hitting streak, a Cardinals record and just two short of matching the all-time National League record. The hitting streak was snapped in Game 4.

Meanwhile, Albert Pujols tied a World Series record in Game 3 by smashing three home runs, joining only Babe Ruth and Reggie Jackson.  "Mr. Octo-bert" also tied World Series single-game records for hits, total bases, RBIs, and runs scored.

The setup

The game

Nelson Cruz hit a solo home run to put the Rangers up 6-4 against the Cardinals in Game 6. The home run allowed Cruz to tie the record for most postseason home runs in a season at 8; he shares the achievement with Carlos Beltrán and Barry Bonds. Game 6 nearly saw the Rangers win the Series, but after twice being one strike away from elimination, St. Louis tied both times –– the first such occurrence in MLB history.

Besides David Freese, Lance Berkman made key contributions for the Cardinals in Game 6 against the Rangers. He hit his first home run in a World Series game in the 1st inning and in the 9th, with St. Louis down to their final strike before elimination, Berkman was driven home followed by Albert Pujols after a game-tying 2-run triple by Freese. After Texas scored two runs in the top of the 10th and Ryan Theriot hit a run-scoring groundout, Berkman hit a two-out two-strike RBI single scoring Jon Jay to tie the game.

The play
Leading off the 11th, Freese hit a walk-off home run to deep center field (420 feet), to send the World Series to its first Game 7 since 2002. Freese joined Jim Edmonds, the man for whom he was traded, as the only players in Cardinals history to hit an extra-inning walk-off home run in the postseason. He joined Aaron Boone (2003), David Ortiz (2004) and Hall of Famers Carlton Fisk (1975) and Kirby Puckett (1991) as the only players to hit an extra-inning walk-off home run when their team was facing postseason elimination. The fan that retrieved the home run ball was subsequently given an autographed bat and ball by Freese after the former returned it to him.

In Game 6, Freese posted the best win probability added in Major League Baseball postseason history, with a 0.969, which is 0.099 better than the Los Angeles Dodgers' Kirk Gibson in Game 1 of the 1988 World Series. The third- and fourth-best WPAs are .854 (by the San Diego Padres' Steve Garvey in Game 4 of the 1984 National League Championship Series) and 0.832 (by the Cardinals' Lance Berkman in Game 6 of the 2011 World Series).

The calls

Joe Buck
Fox play-by-play commentator Joe Buck echoed his late father Jack's call of Kirby Puckett's home run from the 1991 World Series, saying, "...we will see you tomorrow night!" Puckett's and Freese's home runs occurred under similar circumstances: both happened during Game 6 of a World Series, and both Freese and Puckett were the first batter of the eleventh inning. The home runs were hit twenty years and a day apart from each other.

Aftermath

Game 7
In Game 7 of the World Series, Freese hit a two-run double in the bottom of the first inning, bringing his 2011 postseason RBI total to 21, an MLB record. The Cardinals went on to win the game and the series, making Freese a World Series champion for the first time. For his efforts, Freese was named the World Series MVP. He became the sixth player to win the LCS and World Series MVP awards in the same year. Freese also won the Babe Ruth Award as the postseason MVP.

Offseason
Three days after the Series ended, Cardinals manager Tony La Russa announced his retirement, making him the first manager to end his career with a World Series win and with the most managerial victories (1,408) in franchise history.  Pujols declared free agency on October 31.  On December 7, the Houston Astros hired Jeff Luhnow as their general manager, culminating his rise through the Cardinals ranks as a top player developer.  The next day, Pujols signed with the Los Angeles Angels for $254 million, the second-highest valued sports contract in history at the time.

One week later, Baseball America bestowed the Cardinals with their Organization of the Year award for the first time, an award given since 1982.  It was given in part to recognize the increased productivity of the Cardinals farm system.  Seventeen of the 25 players on the Cardinals' 2011 postseason roster were drafted and developed by the Cardinals.  Along with Luhnow, John Mozeliak helped fulfill owner Bill DeWitt, Jr.'s mission to make Cardinals' farm system a consistent producer of prospects who would be key in the club's success.

References

External links
World Series Game 6: David Freese and Biggest Home Runs in Fall Classic History
Remember the 'David Freese Game'? We do - MLB.com
October 27, 2011: David Freese’s home run caps historic World Series Game 6
From the archives: Down to his last strike, David Freese became a World Series hero for St. Louis
World Series 2011: Fan Returns David Freese Home Run Ball

2011 Major League Baseball season
St. Louis Cardinals postseason
Texas Rangers postseason
World Series games
Historic baseball plays
2011 in sports in Missouri
October 2011 sports events in the United States
Baseball competitions in St. Louis
2010s in St. Louis